Amorpha juglandis, the walnut sphinx, is the only species in the monotypic moth genus Amorpha, which is in the family Sphingidae, erected by Jacob Hübner in 1809. The species was first described by James Edward Smith in 1797.

Distribution
It is native to North America, where it is distributed from the Atlantic Ocean to the Rocky Mountains in Canada and the United States.

Description
The wingspan is 45–75 mm.

Biology
The adult moth is nocturnal, active mainly during the early hours of the night.

The caterpillar feeds on alder (Alnus), hickory (Carya), hazelnut (Corylus), beech (Fagus), walnut (Juglans), and hop-hornbeam (Ostrya) species. When attacked by a bird, the caterpillar produces a high-pitched whistle by expelling air from pair of spiracles in its abdomen. This antipredator adaptation may startle the bird, which may then reject the caterpillar.

References

Further reading

External links

"Amorpha juglandis (J. E. Smith, 1797)". Sphingidae of the Americas. Archived June 29, 2006.

Smerinthini
Taxa named by Jacob Hübner
Moths described in 1797
Moths of North America